Volker Oppitz is the name of:

 Volker Oppitz (scientist) (born 1931), German economist and mathematician
 Volker Oppitz (footballer) (born 1978), son of the former and player for Dynamo Dresden